The Night Owl is a 2022 South Korean period thriller drama film directed by Ahn Tae-jin, starring Ryu Jun-yeol and Yoo Hae-jin. Set in the Joseon Dynasty, it is based on the mystery surrounding the death of Crown Prince Sohyeon, who returned from the Qing Dynasty in the Joseon Injo period. It was released on November 23, 2022.

Premise
Kyung-soo is blind but has excellent acupuncture skills. He enters the palace after being recognized for his talent by Lee Hyung-ik. Around that time, Crown Prince Sohyeon, who was taken hostage by the Qing Dynasty, returned to Korea after 8 years. Injo, while happy for his son, is overcome with unknown anxiety for a while. Then one night, Kyung-soo, who can see faintly in the dark, witnesses the death of Crown Prince Sohyeon. As he tries to tell the truth, bigger secrets and conspiracies are revealed, putting his life at risk. After the death of his son, Injo's anxiety turns into madness and begins to run rampant, and Kyung-soo, who witnessed the death of the crown prince, attempts to reveal the truth behind the crown prince’s death.

Cast
 Ryu Jun-yeol as Kyung-soo
 Yoo Hae-jin as King Injo
 Choi Moo-sung as Lee Hyung-ik
 Jo Sung-ha as Young Eui-jeong
 Park Myung-hoon as Man-sik
 Kim Sung-cheol as Crown Prince Sohyeon
 Ahn Eun-jin as Jo So-yong
 Jo Yoon-seo as Crown Princess Minhoe
 Lee Joo-won as Yi Seok-cheol, the eldest son of Crown Prince Sohyeon
 Kim Do-won as Chun Kyung-jae, Kyung-soo's younger brother.

Reception

Box office
, it is the fifth highest-grossing Korean film of 2022, with a gross of US$26,395,809, and 3,317,510 admissions. On December 23, 2022, The Night Owl surpassed 3 million cumulative audiences on this afternoon. An additional 900,000 people were mobilized in two weeks after exceeding the break-even point of 2.1 million on the 8th, which led the box office for three consecutive weeks.

Accolades

References

External links 
 
 
 
 

2022 films
2020s historical films
2020s Korean-language films
Films set in the Joseon dynasty
South Korean historical films
2020s South Korean films